Events in the year 1949 in Japan.

Incumbents
Supreme Commander Allied Powers: Douglas MacArthur
Emperor: Hirohito
Prime Minister: Shigeru Yoshida (L–Kōchi, 3rd term from February 16)
Chief Cabinet Secretary: Eisaku Satō (not Diet member→L–Yamaguchi) until February 16, Kaneshichi Masuda (L–Nagano)
 Chief Justice of the Supreme Court: Tadahiko Mibuchi
 President of the House of Representatives: vacant until February 11, Kijūrō Shidehara (L–Ōsaka)
 President of the House of Councillors: Tsuneo Matsudaira (Ryokufūkai–Fukushima) until November 14, Naotake Satō (Ryokufūkai–Aomori) from November 15
 Diet sessions: 5th (special, February 11 to May 31), 6th (extraordinary, October 25 to November (?)), 7th (regular, December 4 to 1950, May 2)

Governors
Aichi Prefecture: Hideo Aoyagi 
Akita Prefecture: Kosaku Hasuike 
Aomori Prefecture: Bunji Tsushima 
Chiba Prefecture: Tamenosuke Kawaguchi 
Ehime Prefecture: Juushin Aoki 
Fukui Prefecture: Harukazu Obata 
Fukuoka Prefecture: Katsuji Sugimoto 
Fukushima Prefecture: Kan'ichirō Ishihara (until 30 November); vacant thereafter (starting 30 November)
Gifu Prefecture: Kamon Muto 
Gunma Prefecture: Yoshio Iyoku
Hiroshima Prefecture: Tsunei Kusunose 
Hokkaido Prefecture: Toshifumi Tanaka
Hyogo Prefecture: Yukio Kishida 
Ibaraki Prefecture: Yoji Tomosue 
Ishikawa Prefecture: Wakio Shibano 
Iwate Prefecture: Kenkichi Kokubun
Kagawa Prefecture: Keikichi Masuhara 
Kagoshima Prefecture: Kaku Shigenari 
Kanagawa Prefecture: Iwataro Uchiyama 
Kochi Prefecture: Wakaji Kawamura
Kumamoto Prefecture: Saburō Sakurai 
Kyoto Prefecture: Atsushi Kimura 
Mie Prefecture: Masaru Aoki
Miyagi Prefecture: Saburō Chiba (until 3 January); Kazuji Sasaki (starting 25 February)
Miyazaki Prefecture: Tadao Annaka 
Nagano Prefecture: Torao Hayashi 
Nagasaki Prefecture: Sōjirō Sugiyama 
Nara Prefecture: Mansaku Nomura 
Niigata Prefecture: Shohei Okada 
Oita Prefecture: Tokuju Hosoda 
Okayama Prefecture: Hirokichi Nishioka 
Osaka Prefecture: Bunzō Akama 
Saga Prefecture: Gen'ichi Okimori 
Saitama Prefecture: 
 until 28 March: Mizo Nishimura 
 28 March-17 May: Yoshida Tadakazu
 starting 17 May: Yuuichi Oosawa
Shiga Prefecture: Iwakichi Hattori 
Shiname Prefecture: Fujiro Hara 
Shizuoka Prefecture: Takeji Kobayashi 
Tochigi Prefecture: Juukichi Kodaira 
Tokushima Prefecture: Goro Abe 
Tokyo Prefecture: Seiichirō Yasui 
Tottori Prefecture: Aiji Nishio 
Toyama Prefecture: Kunitake Takatsuji 
Wakayama Prefecture: Shinji Ono 
Yamagata Prefecture: Michio Murayama 
Yamaguchi Prefecture: Tatsuo Tanaka 
Yamanashi Prefecture: Katsuyasu Yoshie

Events

January 23 - 1949 Japanese general election
January 26 – A fire breaks out at Hōryū-ji temple in Ikaruga, Nara Prefecture, destroying several murals.
March Unknown date – Mens Shop Ogori, as predecessor of Uniqlo was founded in Ube, Yamaguchi Prefecture.
May 16: Opening of Tokyo, Osaka and Nagoya Stock Exchanges.
May 25: Ministry of International Trade and Industry formed.
June 1: Japanese National Railways become independent of the Ministry of Transportation.
June 22: A Typhoon Della, torrential massibie rain and landslide hit, many ship and fishing boat plunged around Uwa Sea, Ehime Prefecture, 468 person were human fatalities, including a passenger ferry Aoba Maru, and 367 persons were hurt, according to Japanese government official confirmed report. 
July 5 - Shimoyama incident
July 15 - Mitaka incident
August 17 - Matsukawa derailment
September 15: First limited express trains begin operation on JNR lines.
October: Hideki Yukawa becomes the first Japanese winner of a Nobel Prize.
December 1
 Izumi Real Estate, later, Sumitomo Realty & Development was founded.
 Marubeni was established that separate from Itochu.
 December 16 – Auto parts company Denso established.

Films
Late Spring

Births

January 12: Haruki Murakami, author
January 15: Rumi Tama, film director, actress, and screenwriter
January 24: Rihoko Yoshida, voice actress
January 28: Masachika Ichimura, voice actor and musical singer
February 2: Yasuko Namba, mountaineer, summited the Seven Summits (d. 1996)
March 3: Hiroshi Kajikawa, archer
March 23: Aruno Tahara, voice actor
April 26
 Morio Kazama, actor
 Issei Sagawa, murderer
May 9: Kenji Shimaoka, volleyball player
May 11: Terumi Niki, actress
May 12: Moto Hagio, manga artist
May 25: Yuki Katsuragi, singer (d. 2022)
June 5: Guts Ishimatsu, boxer
June 20: Arase Nagahide, sumo wrestler (d. 2008)
June 27: Norio Nagayama, spree killer (d. 1997)
July 14: Toyokazu Nomura, judoka
August 18: Takeshi Shudo, scriptwriter (d. 2010)
September 19: Sayoko Yamaguchi, model and actress (d. 2007)
September 20: Yutaka Higuchi, figure skater
September 21: Yūsaku Matsuda, actor (d. 1989)
October 5: Takajin Yashiki, singer and television celebrity (d. 2014)
October 7: Yuji Katsuro, Nordic combined skier
October 21: Masao Ohba, boxer (d. 1973)
November 17: Yoshito Yasuhara, actor and voice actor
November 21: Kazumasa Hirai, weightlifter
November 24: Tamanofuji Shigeru, sumo wrestler (d. 2021)
November 28: Kyoko Mizuki, author and manga artist
December 2: Shūichi Ikeda, voice actor
December 16: Kensaku Morita, actor, singer and governor of Chiba Prefecture
December 20: Takao Okawara, film director, writer and producer
December 28: Kaoru Kitamura, writer

Deaths
January 8: Yoshijirō Umezu, war leader
January 20: Iwata Nakayama, photographer
February 6: Hiroaki Abe, admiral
May 5: Hideo Nagata, poet and playwright
May 6: Kunihiko Hashimoto, composer, violinist, conductor, and musical educator
May 17: Unno Juza, founding father of Japanese science fiction
June 30: Harukazu Nagaoka, diplomat
July 1: Isamu Takeshita, admiral
July 10: Moritake Tanabe
August 7: Uemura Shōen, artist
August 15: Kanji Ishiwara, war leader
October 12: Kiyoshi Kawakami, journalist
November 3: Hidemitsu Tanaka, author
November 14: Matsudaira Tsuneo, diplomat
November 20: Wakatsuki Reijirō, former prime minister
November 25: Kazuo Mizutani, chief of staff
December 14: Morita Sōhei, author

Statistics
Yen value: US$1 = ¥360 (fixed)

See also
 List of Japanese films of the 1940s

References

 
Years of the 20th century in Japan
1940s in Japan